Maso Capital Partners Limited is a Hong Kong-based hedge fund that was founded and is run by Manoj Jain and Sohit Khurana. The fund is registered in the Cayman Islands under Cayman Islands company law and headquartered in Central, Hong Kong.

History 
Maso Capital was founded in 2012 by two longtime managing directors at Och-Ziff's Asia fund, Manoj Jain and Sohit Khurana, when they decided to start their own Asia hedge fund focused on event-driven investing, merger-arbitrage and convertible arbitrage. The name Maso Capital was chosen as a play on the founding members first names. In July 2012, Jain and Khurana hired Allan Finnerty, a former Mount Kellett executive, as chief operating officer of the fund. Originally hoping to raise only $250 million, by 2015, the fund had scaled to $300 million. As of May 2020, the fund had sold off $151.47 million in US equities with a remaining $247.87 million in US assets under management. The fund also holds multiple equity positions across Asia-Pacific, including Australia on the ASX.

Legal History 
Maso Capital has pioneered a complex and time-consuming legal strategy involving a little-known Cayman Island law, Section 238 of Companies Law, to target bad acting Chinese companies that buyout US shareholders, delist on American markets, and consequently relist on Chinese markets for substantially higher valuations than their American buyout.

Since its inception, Maso Capital has been involved in a number of similar situations and typically invests as a minority shareholder, a quarter to half of its fund in the undervalued US-listed shares it is targeting.  Leveraging Maso Capital’s strategy and resulting legal precedent, other major investment firms such as Prudential, T. Rowe Price and D.E. Shaw have employed the same strategy in filing similar suits. Through 2020, Maso Capital has publicly filed Section 238 valuation dispute petitions against Bona Film Group; Homeinns Hotel Group; Zhaopin Limited; Qihoo 360 Technology Co. Ltd; Kongzhong Corp; JA Solar Holdings; eHi Car Services; Shanda Games; Qunar Cayman Islands; Trina Solar; Nord Anglia Corporation.

Shanda Games 
In 2015, Shanda Games was taken private by a consortium that already owned a majority of the company in a deal valued at $1.9 billion. Maso Capital, which at the time owned 1.6% of Shanda Games, was the sole holdout against the offer price of $7.10 for each American Depository Share. Maso Capital in turn filed what would become a landmark lawsuit alleging the deal was undervalued. The court ruled in favor of Maso Capital and in turn attributed a fair value of $16.68 per share. This ruling was appealed and Maso Capital was eventually awarded $42 million in a landmark lawsuit over a 2015 buyout of Shanda Games Ltd, valuing the company at $1.9 billion. While reflecting on the case to Wall Street Journal reporters, Maso Capital co-founder Manoj Jain stated "We believe in constructive engagement with the management of companies we are invested in and our preference is always to achieve results through dialogue. When we have dissented, it has only been to achieve fair value for shareholders by upholding global corporate governance standards."

Qihoo 360 
In 2015, Qihoo 360, one of China’s largest cybersecurity companies, had agreed to be acquired by a group of investors seeking to take the company private at a valuation of $77 per share or $9.3 billion overall. Minority shareholders in Qihoo 360 had no say in the matter, leveraging their majority stake, big investors forced minority shareholders to agree to the valuation they set themselves in a vote and as a result, all shares were canceled and the company was delisted. At the time of delisting, Maso Capital held $16.9 million in shares of Qihoo 360. In 2018, Qihoo then relisted on the Shanghai Stock Exchange at a $62 billion valuation, yielding a return of more than 550% since they had taken the company private. After the relisting, Maso Capital in turn filed suit against Qihoo360 in the Cayman Courts demanding $92 million in payment based on fair value of the shares it held at the time the company was taken private. Fund managers say $92 million is a conservative estimate of the shares’ true worth and that a more robust expert valuation could in fact yield a much higher share price for Maso Capital. The Cayman Courts have since required Qihoo360 to put $92 million in escrow while the matter is resolved.

Duddell Street Acquisition Corporation 
On October 1, 2020, Maso Capital filed for a $175 million IPO on NASDAQ with a blank check company named Duddell Street Acquisition Corporation.

See also
List of asset management firms
List of hedge funds

References 

Financial services companies established in 2012
2012 establishments in Hong Kong
Hedge funds